The 2019 FC Ryukyu season is the club's first season in the J2 League after winning promotion in the 2018 J3 League.

Competitions

J2 League

League table

Results

Emperor's Cup

Squad statistics

References

FC Ryukyu seasons
Ryuku